Anthony John Rohrs (5 August 1961 – 24 June 1988), was a New Zealand cricketer.

Rohrs was born in Lower Hutt.  He played two first-class matches for the Wellington Firebirds in 1988 before his death in Wellington in a road accident at the age of 26. He also played for Hutt Valley in the Hawke Cup.

References

1961 births
1988 deaths
New Zealand cricketers
Wellington cricketers
Road incident deaths in New Zealand
Cricketers from Lower Hutt